John David Schriffen (born October 3, 1984) is an American sports broadcaster for ESPN, calling collegiate sports and KBO League baseball for the network. Previously Schriffen acted as a reporter for CBS Sports and hosted That Other Pre Game Show on CBS Sports Network.

Schriffen began his career as a sports anchor and reporter for News 12 in New York City. Before joining ABC News, Schriffen spent several years at WRC-TV in Washington D.C where he Schriffen later worked as one of the youngest ABC News correspondents in New York City having earlier interned for ABC's sister network ESPN.

He graduated from Dartmouth College, where he played for the baseball team, and studied journalism during his junior year at Howard University.  Schriffen graduated from the Dwight School, and also attended Hunter College High School in his hometown of New York City. He cites his diverse background (he is both African-American and Caucasian) and his education experiences for his unique perspective.

References

External links
 ABC News author profile for John Schriffen

Living people
1984 births
Alliance of American Football announcers
American radio sports announcers
American reporters and correspondents
American television sports announcers
Baseball announcers
College basketball announcers in the United States
College football announcers
Dartmouth College alumni
Howard University alumni
Major League Baseball broadcasters
National Football League announcers